Sarfati (variously transliterated and spelled Sarfatti, Sarphati, Serfaty, Sarfate, Sarfaty, Sarfity, Zarfati, Tsarfati, Tsarfaty, Tzarfati, Serfati) is a Sephardic Jewish surname. 

The surname literally means "French" in the Hebrew language, and is derived from the Biblical placename Tzarfat which in later times was identified in Jewish tradition as France.

The term "Tzarfati" was frequently applied in rabbinical literature to Jews of French birth or descent.

Origin 
One account places the origin of the surname as being linked to Rashi by way of his grandson Rabbeinu Tam, but the connection, although anchored in the Ketubot traditions has never been fully proven due to a seven generations gap in the genealogy after Jews were expelled from France by Philippe le Bel in 1306.

At any case, numerous bearers of this name (whose ancestors came from France) lived in various parts of the Iberian Peninsula during the 14th-15th centuries: they appear in Spanish and Portuguese documents under the spellings Sarfati and Çarfati. During the 15th century and especially after the expulsion of Jews from these countries (1490s) some branches migrated from the Iberian Peninsula to North Africa, while others to the city of Rome and the Ottoman Empire.

List 
Notable people with the surname include:

Sarfati 
Diana Sarfati, New Zealand public health doctor and epidemiologist
Georges-Elia Sarfati, philosopher, linguist, poet, and an existentialist psychoanalyst
 Jonathan Sarfati (born 1964), Australian–New Zealander chess player and creationist author
 Lea Michele Sarfati (born 1986), American singer and actress, Broadway performer and star of TV show "Glee"
 Lise Sarfati (born 1958), French photographer
 Lydia Sarfati, Polish-born American esthetician, entrepreneur, consultant and author
 Samuel Sarfati (died c. 1519), Italian physician to Popes Alexander VI and Julius II and leader of the Jewish community in Rome
 Semah Sarfati (1624–1717) Tunisian rabbi who was chief rabbi of Tunisia 
 Sonia Sarfati (born 1960), French author and journalist
 Tzedi Tzarfati (born 1941), Israeli television presenter and theatre director
 Yitzhak Sarfati, 15th century Ottoman rabbi

Sarfatti 
 Anna Sarfatti (born 1950), Italian writer of children's books
 Jack Sarfatti (born 1939), American theoretical physicist and writer
 Margherita Sarfatti (1880–1961), Italian journalist and lover of Benito Mussolini
 Riccardo Sarfatti (1940–2010), Italian architect and politician in Lombardy

Sarfate
 Dennis Sarfate (born 1981), American baseball player

Sarfaty 
 Gretta Sarfaty Marchant (born 1947), British-Brazilian artist and curator
 Regina Sarfaty (born 1934), American operatic mezzo-soprano

Sarfatty 
Bouena Sarfatty (1916–1997), Greek-Jewish World War II partisan and poet

Sarphati 
 Samuel Sarphati (1813–1866), Dutch physician and city planner

Serfaty 
 Abraham Serfaty (1926–2010), Moroccan dissident
 Abraham Serfaty (Gibraltarian), former Mayor of Gibraltar
 Christine Daure-Serfaty (1926–2014), French-Moroccan activist
 Dan Serfaty (born 1966) is a French entrepreneur and businessman
 Isaac Chocrón Serfaty  (1930-2011), Venezuelan playwright
 Rosalinda Serfaty (born 1969), Argentine-born Venezuelan actress
 Sylvia Serfaty, French Mathematician, winner of the 2004 EMS Prize for her contributions to the Ginzburg–Landau theory
 Willa Vasquez Serfaty, Gibraltarian artist

See also 
 Olry Terquem (1782–1862), who wrote under the pseudonym "Tsarphati"

References 

Jewish surnames
Maghrebi Jewish surnames
Hebrew-language surnames
Sephardic surnames
Jews and Judaism in France